J0 may refer to:

 , Zeroth order Bessel function of the first kind 
 Yo, often written as j0 in Leet
 J00 (disambiguation)

See also
 JO (disambiguation)